Bergville is a small town situated in the foothills of the Drakensberg mountains, KwaZulu-Natal, South Africa. It was established as Bergville Mountain Village in 1897 and is now the commercial centre for a 2,500 km2 dairy and cattle ranching area. A blockhouse was built by the British soldiers in the town during the Second Boer War

Bergville is equidistant from Johannesburg and Durban and is also known as the gateway to the Northern Drakensberg holiday resorts. It lies on Route R74, which is a more scenic alternative to the N3 Toll Road. This route takes one via the Oliviershoek Pass, traditionally used to access the Drakensberg, from Johannesburg. Bergville is most easily reached from Durban by turning off the N3 after Estcourt, joining the R74 through Winterton towards the mountain.

Bergville is composed mostly of three land areas: the town markert and it's near villages; Amangwane, Amazizi, Acton Homes, Thintwa Village, Rookdale, Bethany, Geluksburg, Woodford and the CBD. Amazizi includes Emazizini and Obonjaneni. Whiles Amangwane are the biggest areas with names such as Emaswazini, Ngoba, Dukuza, Zwelisha, Emoyeni, Emakhosaneni, Ndunwane, Stulwane, Khokhwane, and Magagangangozi. Sanele Mthembu, a well known Programmer also comes from there.

Other towns in the immediate region include
 Ladysmith on the R616
 Acton Homes on the R616 towards Ladysmith
 Geluksburg
Thintwa Village
 Jagersrust on the R74 towards Harrismith - living quarters for workers of the Drakensberg Pumped Storage Scheme

Services
Emmaus Hospital

Projects in the Bergville Area
World Vision
Disability Information Project
Bergville Community Builders

Photo gallery

Notable people 
 Sjava (Jabulani Hadebe), singer, born 1983
 Big Zulu (Siyabonga Nene), rapper, born 1987

References

External links 
 Bergville on Central Drakensberg Information Centre site

Populated places in the Okhahlamba Local Municipality
Tugela River